Wandle can mean:

Rivers
River Wandle, also known as Wandle River, in South London, England
Wandle Valley Wetland
Wandle Trail
Wandle Park, Croydon
Wandle Park tram stop
Wandle Park, Merton
Wandle Meadow Nature Park
Wandle River in South Island, New Zealand

Ships
, a British coastal collier that fought an engagement with UB-27 in 1916
, a British coastal collier that survived being torpedoed in 1942

See also